The 2018 Race of Champions was the 29th running of the event, and took place on 2–3 February 2018 at King Fahd International Stadium in Riyadh, it was the first-ever international motorsport competition in Saudi Arabia.

Participants

Nations' Cup

Group stage

Group A

Group B

Group C

Knockout stage

 Source

Race of Champions

Group stage

Group A

Group B

Group C

Group D

Knockout stage

References

External links 

 

2018
2018 in motorsport
Motorsport in Saudi Arabia
2018 in Saudi Arabian sport
Sport in Riyadh
February 2018 sports events in Asia
International sports competitions hosted by Saudi Arabia